Bela nassoides is a species of sea snail, a marine gastropod mollusk in the family Mangeliidae.

Description
The length of the shell attains 5.5 mm, its diameter 2.6 mm

Distribution
This marine species occurs off Florida.

References

External links

nassoides